The following is a timeline of the history of Kuwait City, Al Asimah Governorate, Kuwait, and its metro surroundings.

Prior to 20th century

 1899 - Treaty with the United Kingdom signed by Mubarak Al-Sabah.
 1900 - Population: 15,000 (approx date).

20th century

 1904 - Seif Palace expansion begins.
 1912 - U.S. mission established.
 1915 - Salim Al-Mubarak Al-Sabah becomes governor of Kuwait City.
 1921
 City wall built.
 Ahmad Al-Jaber Al-Sabah becomes sultan.
 1930 -  established.
 1936 - Central Library established.
 1948 - Population: 80,000 (estimate).
 1950s - Hawally development begins near city.
 1951 - Urban master plan commissioned.
 1957
 City wall taken down.
 Kuwait National Museum founded.
 1961 - Kuwait Fund for Arab Economic Development headquartered in city.
 1962
 City becomes part of newly established Capital Governorate; Nasir Sabah Nasir Mubarak I becomes governor.
 Al-Watan newspaper begins publication.
 1963 - National Assembly of Kuwait headquartered in city.
 1965
 Kuwait Transport Company established; public transit begins (initially from city to Fahaheel).
 Population: 99,633.
 1966 - Kuwait University established.
 1967 - Arab Towns Organization headquartered in Kaifan.
 1970 - Urban master plan commissioned (approximate date).
 1972 - Al-Qabas newspaper begins publication.
 1974 - 7 February: 1974 attack on the Japanese Embassy in Kuwait.
 1975
 International School of Pakistan established in Al Farwaniyah.
 Population: 78,116.
 1976
 Al-Anba newspaper begins publication.
 Kuwait Water Towers built.
 1979
 Kuwait Towers built.
 Salim Sabah Nasir Mubarak I becomes governor (approximate date).
 Jahra Governorate established near city.
 1980 - Kuwait Petroleum Corporation headquartered in city.
 1982 - Kuwait National Assembly Building and Al-Fahed Mosque built.
 1983
 12 December: 1983 Kuwait bombings.
 Dar Al Athar Al Islamiyyah (cultural entity) established.

 1985 - Jabir Abdallah Jabir Abdallah II becomes governor.
 1986 - Grand Mosque (Kuwait) and Al-Marzook Medical Center and Mosque built.
 1988
 Lycée Français de Koweït established in Salmiya.
 Farwaniya Governorate established near city.
 1990 - 2–4 August: Invasion of Kuwait by Iraqi forces.
 1991 - February: Iraqis ousted.
 1993
 Liberation Tower (Kuwait) and Al-Mubarrah Community Center built.
 Urban master plan created by Kuwait Municipality.
 1994 - National Library of Kuwait headquartered in city.
 1995 - Population: 28,747 in Kuwait City.
 1998 - Al-Sharq Waterfront built.
 1999 - Mubarak Al-Kabeer Governorate established near city.

21st century

 2001 - Population: 388,532 in Capital Governorate (estimate).
 2002 - April: 2002 West Asian Games held.
 2003
 Museum of Modern Art opens.
 Urban master plan created.
 2004
 Kuwait Petroleum Corporation Tower built.
 American University of Kuwait opens in Salmiya.
 2005 - Dar Al Awadi Tower built in Sharq.
 2006 - 29 June: Kuwaiti general election, 2006 held; the first including women voters.
 2008 - Kuwait International Airport new terminal built.
 2009 - Arraya Tower built.
 2011 - Al Hamra Tower built.
 2014 - Population: 538,053 in Capital Governorate; (plus nearby urban areas: 1,094,576 in Farwaniya Governorate, 898,401 in Hawalli Governorate, and 232,428 in Mubarak Al-Kabeer Governorate).

See also
 Kuwait City history
 Other names of Kuwait City
 List of areas of Capital Governorate

References

Bibliography

Published in 19th century
 
 

Published in 20th century
 
 
 
 
 
 
 
 
 

Published in 21st century
 
 
 
 

Al Asimah Governorate (Kuwait)
Kuwait City
 
Kuwait-related lists
Years in Kuwait
Kuwait City